is a Japanese former swimmer. She competed in three events at the 1968 Summer Olympics.

References

External links
 

1952 births
Living people
Japanese female freestyle swimmers
Olympic swimmers of Japan
Swimmers at the 1968 Summer Olympics
Sportspeople from Aichi Prefecture
Asian Games medalists in swimming
Asian Games gold medalists for Japan
Asian Games bronze medalists for Japan
Swimmers at the 1966 Asian Games
Medalists at the 1966 Asian Games
20th-century Japanese women